Rajiv Gandhi Indoor Stadium is a multi-purpose sports complex in Kottayam, Kerala, India.

References

Multi-purpose stadiums in India
Sports venues in Kerala
Sport in Kottayam
2016 establishments in Kerala
Sports venues completed in 2016